The GBU-16 Paveway II is an American Paveway-series laser-guided bomb, based on the  Mk 83 general-purpose bomb, but with laser seeker and wings for guidance.  The GBU-16 was introduced into service around 1976 and is used by the U.S. Air Force, U.S. Navy, U.S. Marine Corps, and various NATO air forces.

GBU-16 bombs are produced by Lockheed Martin and Raytheon.  Raytheon began production after purchasing the product line from Texas Instruments. Lockheed Martin was awarded a contract to compete with Raytheon when there was a break in production caused by transferring manufacturing out of Texas.

Raytheon production of the GBU-16 is centered in Arizona, Texas, and New Mexico.  Lockheed Martin's production is centered in Pennsylvania.

Laser Guided Bombs are often labeled as "smart bombs" despite requiring external input in the form of laser designation of the intended target. According to Raytheon's fact sheet for the PAVEWAY 2, 99 deliveries of guided munitions will yield a circular error probability (CEP) of only , versus  for 99 unguided bombs dropped under similar conditions.

External links
 Raytheon's official Paveway fact page
 Globalsecurity.org Paveway fact page
 

Guided bombs of the United States
Military equipment introduced in the 1970s